Endelkachew or Endalkachew is an Ethiopian name. Notable people with the name include:

 Makonnen Endelkachew (1890–1963), Ethiopian aristocrat and Prime Minister
 Endelkachew Makonnen (1927–1974), Ethiopian Prime Minister
 Endalkachew Kebede (born 1980), Ethiopian boxer

Ethiopian given names